Not Going Anywhere is the third studio album by French musician Keren Ann, and her debut English album. The album was released on 25 November 2003 in France and on 24 August 2004 in the United States. It contains four English versions of songs from her previous album La Disparition.

Track listing

Charts

References

Keren Ann albums
2003 albums
EMI Records albums